Andreas Lyager Hansen (born 1 December 1997) is a speedway rider from Denmark.

Speedway career 
Lyager joined Scunthorpe Scorpions for the 2015 Premier League speedway season and 2016 Premier League speedway season.

Lyager reached two finals of the World Under-21 Championships in 2017 and 2018 and was the Danish Junior champion in 2018, following two silver medals in the previous two years. He also won three medals at the Junior World Team Championships (bronze in 2016 and 2017 and silver in 2018) and a bronze medal at the 2017 Individual Speedway Junior European Championship.

In 2022, he rode for Rybnik in Poland, Slangerup in Denmark and Indianerna in Sweden.

References 

1997 births
Living people
Danish speedway riders
Scunthorpe Scorpions riders